"Wonderful Shadow" is a song by British singer-songwriter Tanita Tikaram, which was released in 1995 as the second single from her fifth studio album Lovers in the City. The song was solely written and produced by Tikaram. "Wonderful Shadow" reached No. 198 on the UK Singles Chart in April 1995.

Background
Speaking to the Evening Herald in 1995, Tikaram said of the song: "It's about somebody who sees love in everything. They're absolutely abandoned. I have a sneaking desire to be that person. I know more people who are like that and I'm attracted to them, because I'm amazed at people who follow their own desire."

Critical reception
On its release, Music & Media wrote: "It might be hip to say Tanita is over, but it's not fair. Without being unfaithful to her roots she's steadily innovating her fragile music. The rhythm track underneath brings out the best in her." In a review of Lovers in the City, Paul Robicheau of The Boston Globe noted the song was "set to a lazy dance beat". He also commented on the contrast between "I Might Be Crying" and "Wonderful Shadow", as they "explore both sides of romance". Out described the song as "sweet" and "well worth chasing Lovers in the City down [for]". Oliver P. Sweeney of Hot Press noted the song's "shuffly percussion". The Gavin Report considered the song to be the album's "centerpiece".

Track listing
CD single (Europe and UK release)
 "Wonderful Shadow" – 6:10
 "Have You Lost Your Way?" – 13:15
 "Good Tradition" – 2:50

CD single (German #2 release)
 "Wonderful Shadow" – 6:10
 "Wonderful Shadow" (Reconstruction Version) – 6:27
 "Out on the Town" – 2:50

CD single (German promo)
 "Wonderful Shadow" (Edit) – 3:32
 "Wonderful Shadow" (Original Version) – 6:10
 "Have You Lost Your Way?" – 13:15
 "Good Tradition" – 2:50

Personnel
Wonderful Shadow
 Tanita Tikaram – vocals
 Mark Creswell, Adam Kirk – guitar
 Stevie Williams – bass, percussion, drum programming
 The London Session Orchestra – strings
 Gavyn Wright – string arrangement, conductor

Production
 Tanita Tikaram – producer of "Wonderful Shadow", "Have You Lost Your Way?" and "Out on the Town"
 Peter Van Hooke, Rod Argent – producers of "Good Tradition"
 Steve Williams – producer of "Wonderful Shadow" (Reconstruction Version)
 Steve Price – engineer and mixing on "Wonderful Shadow"
 Tim Young – mastering on "Wonderful Shadow"

Other
 Farrington Associates – design
 Jean-Baptiste Mondino – photography

Charts

References

1995 songs
1995 singles
Tanita Tikaram songs
Songs written by Tanita Tikaram
East West Records singles
Music videos directed by Jean-Baptiste Mondino